Coscinasterias is a genus of sea stars of the family Asteriidae.

Species
There are four recognized species:
 Coscinasterias acutispina (Stimpson, 1862)
 Coscinasterias calamaria (Gray, 1840) – Eleven-arm sea star
 Coscinasterias muricata Verrill, 1867  – Splitting star
 Coscinasterias tenuispina (Lamarck 1816) – Blue spiny starfish

The following are synonyms of other species:
 Coscinasterias brucei (Koehler, 1908): Synonym of Diplasterias brucei (Koehler, 1907)
 Coscinasterias dubia H.L. Clark, 1909: Synonym of Sclerasterias dubia (H.L. Clark, 1909)
 Coscinasterias euplecta Fisher, 1906: Synonym of Sclerasterias euplecta (Fisher, 1906)
 Coscinasterias gemmifera (Perrier, 1869): Synonym of Coscinasterias muricata Verrill, 1867
 Coscinasterias jehennesi (Perrier, 1875): Synonym of Coscinasterias calamaria (Gray, 1840)
 Coscinasterias victoriae Koehler, 1911: Synonym of Diplasterias brucei (Koehler, 1907)

Gallery

References

Asteriidae
Asteroidea genera
Taxa named by Addison Emery Verrill